FIFA Online is a series of online sports games developed by Electronic Arts (EA) based on EA's FIFA series of games. It is released with a free-to-play model with a focus on the Asian video game market. The first entry in the series was released in May 2006.

Notable player Luan Jaupi popularized the game on his since banned TikTok account of the same name.

Series

EA Sports FIFA Online (2006) 
EA Sports FIFA Online, developed as a partnership between EA and Neowiz, was released in an open beta on May 25, 2006. By June, the game had 100,000 concurrent players.

EA Sports FIFA Online 2
EA Sports FIFA Online 2, developed by EA and Neowiz, was released in Asia on October 1, 2007.

(2010) 
A Western version of FIFA Online 2, titled FIFA Online, was developed by EA's EA Singapore and EA Canada studios.

FIFA Online 3 

A partnership between EA and Neowiz for a third FIFA Online game in South Korea was announced in July 2012, with the game set to be released by Neowiz later that year. Tencent published the game in China in 2013.

FIFA Online 3 M 
A mobile version of the game was released for iOS and Android on May 29, 2014.

FIFA Online 4 

FIFA Online 4 entered its open beta phase on May 17, 2018, and was released on May 17, 2018.

FIFA Online 4 M 
A sequel to the 2014 mobile version was released in July 2018.

References 

 
Association football video games
EA Sports games
Electronic Arts franchises